AIS Airlines is a Dutch airline headquartered at Lelystad Airport in the Netherlands. In addition to scheduled flights, it operates charter and wet lease services. The company operates international charters and scheduled services between Denmark and the Netherlands, as well as domestic scheduled services in Germany and Sweden.

The AIS Group also includes AIS Technics which provides technical support and the AIS Flight Academy. The AIS Flight Academy is a flight school located at Lelystad Airport and is engaged in the integrated training of commercial pilots (ATPL(A)). In addition to the flight school, AIS has a so-called 'type training' for the Jetstream 31/32. AIS's Jetstream full flight simulator is the only approved simulator for this aircraft type in the world.

Overview
The company started as a flight school and then expanded into the airline business. The airline started an expansion of scheduled routes, mainly within Germany, in 2014, including some formerly served by the now-defunct OLT Express Germany. Flights from Bremen to Luxembourg, Malmö and Nuremberg were announced for autumn 2014, but these plans were later cancelled. By January 2015, AIS Airlines additionally took over some Swedish domestic routes under its own brand, that it formerly operated on behalf of Direktflyg.

On February 27, 2020, AIS Airlines discontinued the Münster-Osnabrück route to Copenhagen (via Groningen).

As of October 2021, AIS Airlines only operates the Torsby route to Stockholm Arlanda via Hagfors on behalf of Amapola Flyg.

Destinations

AIS Airlines serves the following scheduled destinations:

Sweden (on behalf of Amapola Flyg)
 Torsby - Torsby Airport
 Hagfors - Hagfors Airport
 Stockholm - Stockholm Arlanda Airport

Fleet
As of October 2021, the AIS Airlines fleet consists of the following aircraft:

References

External links
 www.aisairlines.nl Official website
 aisflightacademy.com

Airlines of the Netherlands
Airlines established in 2009
Charter airlines
Companies based in Flevoland
Dutch companies established in 2009